El Gran Orgo is the third EP by American post-hardcore band At the Drive-In. It was recorded and released in 1997 without the presence of Jim Ward, whose guitar duties were filled by Ben Rodriguez and Omar Rodriguez, the latter of whom had previously played bass on Acrobatic Tenement.

The Title "El Gran Orgo" is taken from one of the characters of the movie Santa Sangre by Alejandro Jodorowsky. Both Omar Rodríguez-López and Cedric Bixler-Zavala are declared fans of Jodorowsky's work.

The band intended to embark on a 100 day long tour to support the EP's release, but release date delays and the falling out between Rodriguez and the rest of the band caused the tour to end after only 2 weeks. The group, unhappy with the delays of the EP, parted ways with Offtime Records, and attempted to file a lawsuit against the label to obtain the masters. They have encouraged their fans to illegally download it in the past, stating "when you buy El Gran Orgo you do not support ATDI, you support DISHONESTY!!"

Track listing
"Give It a Name" – 2:36
"Honest to a Fault" – 1:29
"Winter Month Novelty" – 3:40
"Intermission" – 0:53
"Fahrenheit" – 2:25
"Picket Fence Cartel" – 2:30
"Speechless" – 3:29

Personnel
Cedric Bixler - lead vocals
Omar Rodriguez - guitar, backing vocals
Ben Rodriguez - guitar, backing vocals
Paul Hinojos - bass guitar
Tony Hajjar - drums

References

1997 EPs
At the Drive-In EPs
Post-hardcore EPs